Squire D. Rushnell, also known as SQuire Rushnell, is an American author and inspirational speaker and former television executive.
His books in the When God Winks series have appeared on the New York Times bestseller list.

Television career
Rushnell was a successful television executive who led Good Morning America to first place for the first time, and was a father of Schoolhouse Rock which shared 75 Emmys with The ABC Afterschool Specials and other children's programs under his leadership.

The Kingdom Chums
Rushnell started the project The Kingdom Chums as ABC's vice-president for long-range planning and children's television. Speaking on the general landscape of children's television, Rushnell stated that he "felt that there were a lot of weeds in this garden...I think that we can make it better."

Post-television career
According to Lisa Belkin, writing in the New York Times, his first book was published by a small press with modest sales in late 2001. Today his books in print exceed one million. Rushnell also tours as an inspirational speaker for, among others, Habitat for Humanity.

Godwink
Rushnell is credited with coining the term godwink, which he defines as "An event or personal experience, often identified as coincidence, so astonishing that it could only have come from divine origin."
Paul Froese and Christopher Bader wrote in their book America's Four Gods: What We Say about God-- & what that Says about Us that Rushnell has trademarked the term.

Works

References

External links
Godwinks official website
When God Winks website
Dogwinks website

American spiritual writers
Place of birth missing (living people)
Living people
Year of birth missing (living people)